Viktor Viktorovich Rakov (born February 5, 1962) is a Soviet and Russian film and theater actor. People's Artist of Russia (2003).

Biography 
Was born February 5, 1962, in Moscow.

In 1984 he graduated from GITIS (course of Vladimir Andreyev). Immediately after the actor's faculty was in the company of Mark Zakharov and became an actor Lenkom Theatre, where he works to this day.

He is famous in theatrical circles after the execution of roles in plays such Lenkom  as Sage, Juno and Avos,  The Star and Death of Joaquin Murieta, The Noax.

In the film debuted in 1983. The first major role was in the film by Mark Zakharov  To Kill a Dragon - Heinrich, Burgermeister's son.

Viewers also remember the work of Viktor Rakov in such films as  Love in Russian, Barkhanov vand his bodyguard, in the TV series  Law  (the role of Vladimir Krokhmal),  St. Petersburg secrets,   Isolation Petersburg secrets.

In his spare time he enjoys painting. In addition, Viktor Rakov refers to singing dramatic actors. His repertoire includes a number of songs Yan Frenkel, Andrey Petrov, Yelena Surzhikova, Nicholay Parfenyuk, Katya Semyonova and other composers.

There is a son from his first marriage with classmate Olga Ilyukhina - Boris (1987). Wife - Lyudmila Rakova. The family has two children - daughter Anastasia (1992) and foster-son Danila (2008).

This year 2022 will already be the 60th anniversary.

Works

Theatre
Sage as Glumov
The Star and Death of Joaquin Muretta as Joaquin Muretta, Lead and customs officer, organ grinder
Hamlet as Laertes
Juno and Avos as Fernando Lopez, man of the theater, Burning heretic, Count Rezanov
The Royal Game as Thomas Cromwell
Jester Balakirev as Menshikov  
Va-Bank  as Dulchin  
Marriage as Podkolyosin
Peer Gynt as Davorsky grandfather, King of Trolls
White lie as Senor Balboa, grandfather (director by Gleb Panfilov)
Skywalker as Ryabovsky

Selected filmography

1984 —  A Strong Personality of 2A as a construction worker
1987 —  Akseleratka as Pavel 
1988 —  To Kill a Dragon   as Heinrich, Burgermeister's son
1989 —  Was there Carotene? as Friedrich Woermann
1989 —  His cross as Sergey Troitsky
1990 —  Mother   as Pavel Vlasov
1990 —  Humiliated and Insulted  as Alyosha Valkovsky
1991 —  Bes as Bes
1991 —  Kremlin Secrets of The Sixteenth Century as a young magician
1992 —  Gardes-Marines III   as Baron von Brockdorf
1994 —  The Master and Margarita   as Master
1994 —  St. Petersburg secrets as Prince Nikolai Chechevinsky / Count Kallash
1995 —  Love in Russian as Mikhail
1996 —  Barkhanov  and His Bodyguard as Alyabyev
1998 —  The Judge in The Trap as Rembl
2000 —  The Romanovs: An Imperial Family  as Tsar Nicholas II (voice)
2001 —  Salomeya as Ratsky
2002 —  Next 2 as Kirsanov
2002 —  Law as Vladimir Krokhmal
2003 —  Tabloid Paperback as Lavochkin
2006 —   Alive   as philosopher
2008 —  Daughter as Pyotr Gurov
2008 —  Print Solitude as Stepan
2008 —  Silver Samurai as historian Rogachyov
2009 —  Colourful twilight as son
2009 —  The Admiral  as investigator Popov
2011 —  Rader as Sergey Kolesov, head of security
2011 —  Hiromant. The Fate Lines as priest
2012 —  Once in Rostov as Vladimir Tolstopyatov, projectionist
2013 —  The Three Musketeers   as Mr. Bonacieux
2014 —  House with Lilies   as Miron Polischuk
2015 —  Catherine the Great as Count Alexei Razumovsky

Prizes and awards
 Honored Artist of the Russian Federation (1996) - for achievements in the arts
  Theatre Award  Seagull  in the nomination  Best Villain  for her role in the play The Royal Game
 People's Artist of Russia (2003)
 Order of Friendship (2013)

References

External links
 Official website

 Виктор Раков на сайте Ленкома

1962 births
Russian male film actors
Russian male stage actors
Soviet male stage actors
Russian male television actors
Living people
People's Artists of Russia
Honored Artists of the Russian Federation
Russian Academy of Theatre Arts alumni
Male actors from Moscow